Mary Catherine Clancy (born 13 January 1948) is a Canadian former politician and former lawyer. She was the Member of Parliament representing Halifax from 1988 to 1997.

Career
Clancy won the Halifax electoral district for the Liberal Party in the 1988 and 1993 federal elections. After serving in the 34th and 35th Canadian Parliaments, Clancy was defeated in the 1997 federal election by New Democratic Party leader Alexa McDonough.

Subsequently, in 1997, she was appointed Canadian Consul General to Boston.

From 2002 to 2003, Clancy was President of Burlington College in Burlington, Vermont.

In popular culture
The 1997 federal election competition between Clancy and McDonough is the subject of the 1999 National Film Board documentary Why Women Run.

Electoral record

References

External links

1948 births
Canadian diplomats
Women members of the House of Commons of Canada
Canadian women diplomats
Liberal Party of Canada MPs
Living people
Members of the House of Commons of Canada from Nova Scotia
People from Halifax, Nova Scotia
Women in Nova Scotia politics
Canadian academic administrators
Heads of universities and colleges in the United States